Doremure Gamage Miran Charuka (born 20 November 1982) is a Sri Lankan politician and a former member of the Parliament of Sri Lanka.

Early life and education
Nambukara Helambage Chathura Sandeepa Senaratne was born 20 November 1982 the son of Rajitha (a dentist and politician) and Sujatha (a dentist), he received his education at Ananda College, Colombo and was admitted to the University of Colombo to study for a MBBS degree in medicine in 2004 but dropped out. He then took up politics full-time.

Political career

Early career
Working with his father in his political activities in the Kalutura electorate, Senaratne served as President of the Kalutara District Development Foundation, Chief Organiser of the Rajitha Senaratne Foundation and traveled widely in Europe, Asia accompanying his father on official travels and attending study tours in the United States. He became worked for the United National Party and between 2007 and 2014 for the United People's Freedom Alliance following his father's defection to the SLFP dominated UPFA government in January 2007.

Presidential election 2015 
He campaigned along with his father for the common opposition candidate Maithripala Sirisena at the 2015 presidential election.

Parliamentary election 2015
He contested in the 2015 parliamentary election as the United National Front for Good Governance (UNFGG) candidate in the Gampaha electorate and was elected to Parliament.

Parliamentary Election 2020 
He contested the general elections in 2020 as the Samagi Jana Balawegaya candidate in the Gampaha electorate, but was unsuccessful in getting elected.

See also
List of political families in Sri Lanka

References

Sinhalese politicians
Living people
Members of the 15th Parliament of Sri Lanka
21st-century Sri Lankan politicians
Alumni of Ananda College
1982 births